Dagoberto Campos Salas is a Costa Rican prelate of the Catholic Church who works in the diplomatic service of the Holy See. He is the Apostolic Nuncio to Panama since 2022.

He is the first native of Costa Rica to hold the title of apostolic nuncio.

Biography 
Salas was born on 14 March 1966 to Dimas Campos and Benilda Salas in Puntarenas, Costa Rica, and after the age of ten lived in Abangares and Poás as well. He was ordained a priest on 22 May 1994 for the Diocese of Tilarán-Liberia and spent the next year as chaplain in the presidential palace during the administration of President José María Figueres. 

He earned a degree in canon law and studied at the Pontifical Ecclesiastical Academy from 1995 to 1999 and  He entered the diplomatic service of the Holy See on 1 July 1999, filling assignments in the nunciatures in Sudan (1999-2003), Chile (2003-2006), Switzerland, Turkey and Mexico.

On 28 July 2018, Pope Francis appointed Apostolic Nuncio to Liberia and Titular Archbishop of Forontoniana. Salas was ordained a bishop by Cardinal Pietro Parolin at St. Peter's Basilica on 29 September 2018. He was given additional responsibilities as Nuncio to the Gambia on 17 August 2018 and to Sierra Leone on 17 November 2018.

In Liberia, he received a complaint of abuse on the part of two bishops from a former priest; with the head of the Liberian Bishops Conference, he visited the Vatican in June 2019 to discuss the accusations and the bishops' denials.

On 14 May 2022, Pope Francis named him Apostolic Nuncio to the Panama.

See also
 List of heads of the diplomatic missions of the Holy See

References

External links
 Catholic Hierarchy: Archbishop Dagoberto Campos Salas 

Apostolic Nuncios to Liberia
Apostolic Nuncios to the Gambia
Apostolic Nuncios to Sierra Leone
Living people
1966 births
People from Puntarenas
Costa Rican Roman Catholic bishops
21st-century Roman Catholic titular archbishops